Where There's Smoke... is the debut studio album by American country music group Gibson/Miller Band. It was released in 1993 via Epic Records. The album includes five singles: "Big Heart", "High Rollin'", "Texas Tattoo", "Small Price", and "Stone Cold Country". Except for "Small Price", these all charted within Top 40 on Hot Country Songs between 1992 and 1994.

The track "Where There's Smoke" was later recorded by Archer/Park on their 1994 album We Got a Lot in Common, and was a No. 29 single for them in 1994.

Critical reception
A review from People was positive, stating that "Fueled by tongue-in-cheek lyrics...and Dave Gibson’s weathered tenor, their debut album conjures up freewheeling, fast-drinking honkytonk nights."

Track listing

Personnel
Adapted from Where There's Smoke liner notes.

Gibson/Miller Band
Mike Daly – steel guitar, lap steel guitar
Dave Gibson – lead vocals, guitar
Bryan Grassmeyer – bass guitar, background vocals
Steve Grossman – drums, percussion
Blue Miller – lead vocals, lead guitar

Additional musicians
Bruce Bouton – steel guitar
Mark Morris – percussion
Steve Nathan – Hammond B-3 organ
Biff Watson – rhythm guitar
John Willis – rhythm guitar

Technical
Tommy Cooper – engineering
Doug Johnson – producer, engineering
Blue Miller – associate producer
Denny Purcell – mastering
Ed Seay – recording, mixing

References

1993 debut albums
Epic Records albums
Gibson/Miller Band albums
Albums produced by Doug Johnson (record producer)